The 2016 Segunda División season, also known as Copa Best Cable Perú 2016 for sponsorship reasons, was the 71st edition of the second tier of Federación Peruana de Futbol. The tournament was played on a home-and-away round-robin basis. The season started on 23 April 2016. The fixtures were announced on 12 April 2016.

Teams

A total of 16 teams in the league, 4 more than the previous season, including 9 sides from the 2015 season, two relegated from the 2015 Torneo Descentralizado and five promoted from the 2015 Copa Perú.

The 2016 season was the first one were former Copa Sudamericana winners Cienciano were competing outside of the top tier since 1974. Sport Loreto was relegated to the Segunda Division after one year in the top tier. León de Huánuco refused to play in the 2016 Segunda Division and was relegated to the 2016 Copa Perú.

The teams which had been relegated from the Segunda División the previous season were Atlético Minero, and San Simón. San Simón was disabled mid-season and relegated to the Copa Perú for outstanding debts with the SAFAP.

Five Copa Perú teams were promoted: Cantolao, Alfredo Salinas, Unión Tarapoto, Sport Áncash and Cultural Santa Rosa. Cantolao was promoted as 2015 Copa Perú runner-up. Alfredo Salinas, Unión Tarapoto, Sport Áncash and Cultural Santa Rosa were invited to fill in the vacated spots after a strict financial analysis.

League table

Results

Title play-off
Because Cantolao and Sport Ancash finished the regular season with the same number of points, a title play-off match will be played on neutral ground to decide the champion and owner of the 2017 Torneo Descentralizado berth.

See also
 2016 Torneo Descentralizado
 2016 Copa Perú

References

External links 

  
Tournament regulations 
Peruvian Segunda División news at Peru.com 
Peruvian Segunda División statistics and news at Dechalaca.com 
Peruvian Segunda División news at SegundaPerú.com 
RSSSF

2016
2016 in Peruvian football